The  is a Japanese dynasty that was formerly a powerful daimyō family. They nominally descended from Emperor Seiwa (850–880) and were a branch of the Minamoto clan (Seiwa Genji) through the Matsudaira clan. The early history of this clan remains a mystery. Members of the clan ruled Japan as shōguns during the Edo Period from 1603 to 1867.

History
Minamoto no Yoshishige (1135–1202), grandson of Minamoto no Yoshiie (1041–1108), was the first to take the name of Nitta. He sided with his cousin Minamoto no Yoritomo against the Taira clan (1180) and accompanied him to Kamakura. Nitta Yoshisue, 4th son of Yoshishige, settled at Tokugawa (Kozuke province) and took the name of that place. Their provincial history book did not mention Minamoto clan or Nitta clan.

The nominal originator of the Matsudaira clan was reportedly Matsudaira Chikauji, who was originally a poor Buddhist monk. He reportedly descended from Nitta Yoshisue in the 8th generation and witnessed the ruin of the Nitta in their war against the Ashikaga. He settled at Matsudaira (Mikawa province) and was adopted by his wife's family. Their provincial history book claimed that this original clan was Ariwara clan. Because this place is said to have been reclaimed by Ariwara Nobumori, one theory holds that Matsudaira clan was related to Ariwara no Narihira. 

Matsudaira Nobumitsu (15th century), son of Chikauji, was in charge of Okazaki Castle, and strengthened the authority of his family in the Mikawa province. Nobumitsu's great-great-grandson Matsudaira Kiyoyasu made his clan strong, but was assassinated. In 1567, Matsudaira Motonobu – then known as Tokugawa Ieyasu (1542–1616) – grandson of Kiyoyasu, was recognized by Emperor Ōgimachi as a descendant of Seiwa Genji; he also started the family name Tokugawa. 

The clan rose to power at the end of the Sengoku period. To the end of the Edo period they ruled Japan as shōguns. There were fifteen Tokugawa shōguns. Their dominance was so strong that some history books use the term "Tokugawa era" instead of "Edo period". Their principal family shrine is the Tōshō-gū in Nikkō, and principal temple is at Kan'ei-ji in Tokyo. Heirlooms of the clan are partly administered by the Tokugawa Memorial Foundation.

After the death of Ieyasu, in 1636, the heads of the gosanke (the three branches with fiefs in Owari, Kishū, and Mito) also bore the Tokugawa surname, so did the three additional branches, known as the gosankyō: the Tayasu (1731), Hitotsubashi (1735), and Shimizu (1758) family, after the ascension of Tokugawa Yoshimune. Once a shōgun died without a living heir, both the heads of gosanke (except Mito-Tokugawa family) and gosankyō had priority to succeed his position. Many daimyōs descended from cadet branches of the clan, however, retained the surname Matsudaira; examples include the Matsudaira of Fukui and Aizu. Members of the Tokugawa clan intermarried with prominent daimyo and the Imperial family.

On November 9, 1867, Tokugawa Yoshinobu, the 15th and the last shōgun of Tokugawa, tendered his resignation to Emperor Meiji. He formally stepped down ten days later, returning governing power to the Emperor, marking the end of the ruling power of the Tokugawa shogunate. In 1868, Tokugawa Iesato (1863–1940, from Tayasu family) was chosen as the heir to Yoshinobu as the head of Tokugawa clan. On July 7, 1884, Iesato became a prince, just like the heads of some of other notable Japanese noble families, known as Kazoku. 

The 1946 Constitution of Japan abolished the kazoku and the noble titles, making Iesato's son, Iemasa Tokugawa, no longer a prince. Iemasa had a son Iehide, who died young, so he was succeeded by one of his grandsons, Tsunenari. 
Tsunenari is the second son of Toyoko (eldest daughter of Iemasa) and Ichirō Matsudaira (son of Tsuneo Matsudaira), and he is also a patrilineal descendant of Tokugawa Yorifusa, the youngest son of Tokugawa Ieyasu. 

In 2007, Tsunenari published a book entitled Edo no idenshi (江戸の遺伝子), released in English in 2009 as The Edo Inheritance, which seeks to counter the common belief among Japanese that the Edo period was like a Dark Age, when Japan, cut off from the world, fell behind. On the contrary, he argues, the roughly 250 years of peace and relative prosperity saw great economic reforms, the growth of a sophisticated urban culture, and the development of the most urbanized society on the planet.  Tsunenari formed the Tokugawa Memorial Foundation in 2003 to preserve and administer the historical objects, art, armor and documents that have been passed down in the Tokugawa family over the generations, display them for the general public and provide assistance to academic research on topics concerning historical Japan.

Simplified descent

Symbol 

The Tokugawa's clan symbol, known in Japanese as a "mon", the "triple hollyhock" (although commonly, but mistakenly identified as "hollyhock", the "aoi" actually belongs to the birthwort family and translates as "wild ginger"—Asarum), has been a readily recognized icon in Japan, symbolizing in equal parts the Tokugawa clan and the last shogunate.

The symbol derives from a mythical clan, the Kamo clan, which legendarily descended from Yatagarasu. Matsudaira village was located in Higashikamo District, Aichi Prefecture. Although Emperor Go-Yōzei offered a new symbol, Ieyasu continued to use the symbol, which was not related to Minamoto clan.

In jidaigeki, the symbol is often shown to locate the story in the Edo period. In works set in during the Meiji Restoration movement, the symbol is used to show the bearer's allegiance to the shogunate—as opposed to the royalists, whose cause is symbolized by the Imperial throne's chrysanthemum symbol. Compare with the red and white rose iconography of English Wars of the Roses, as imagined by Walter Scott earlier in the 19th century, in Anne of Geierstein (1829).

Family members
Tokugawa Ieyasu
Tokugawa Hidetada
Matsudaira Nobuyasu
Kamehime
Yūki Hideyasu
Matsudaira Ietada
Matsudaira Tadaaki
Matsudaira Tadanao
Tokuhime
Komatsuhime
Tokugawa Iemitsu
Senhime

Tokugawa Mitsukuni
Tokugawa Iesada
Tsunenari Tokugawa
Muneyoshi Tokugawa
Yoshitomo Tokugawa
Iehiro Tokugawa

Retainers

Clans

Abe clan of Mikawa Province
Gosankyō
Honda clan
Ii clan
Ishikawa clan
Ōkubo clan
Sakai clan

Important retainers

Abe Masakatsu
Akaza Naoyasu
Amano Yasukage
Ando Naotsugu
Ando Shigenobu
Aoyama Tadanari
Ariyama Toyouji
Asano Nagaakira
Baba Nobushige
Fukushima Masanori
Fukushima Masayori
Furuta Shigekatsu
Hattori Hanzō
Hattori Masanari
Hiraiwa Chikayoshi
Hirose Kagefusa
Hisamatsu Sadakatsu
Honda Hirotaka
Honda Masanobu
Honda Masazumi
Honda Narishige
Honda Shigetsugu
Honda Tadakatsu
Honda Tadamasa
Honda Tadatoki
Honda Tadatsugu
Honda Tadazumi
Honda Yasutoshi (1569–1621)
Honda Yasutoshi (1693–1747)
Hoshina Masamitsu
Hoshina Masanao
Hoshina Masatoshi
Ii Naotora
Ii Naomasa
Ii Naotaka
Ii Naotsugu
Ina Tadatsugu
Ishikawa Kazumasa
Ishin Sūden
Kikkawa Hiroie
Kobayakawa Hideaki
Kōriki Kiyonaga
Kutsuki Mototsuna
Mizuno Nobumoto
Naitō Ienaga
Naitō Nobunari
Natsume Yoshinobu
Ogasawara Ujisuke
Ogawa Suketada
Ōkubo Tadayo
Ōkubo Tadasuke
Ōkubo Tadachika
Ōkubo Nagayasu
Okudaira Sadamasa
Sakai Tadatsugu
Sakakibara Yasumasa
Suganuma Sadamitsu
Torii Tadayoshi
Torii Mototada
Uemura Masakatsu
Wakisaka Yasuharu
Watanabe Moritsuna

References

External links

Tokugawa memorial foundation

 
Japanese clans